Grace Garrett Durand (August 25, 1867 – February 26, 1948) was an American clubwoman, business owner, and temperance activist.

Early life
Grace Denise Garrett was born in Burlington, Iowa, the daughter of William Garrett and Martha Rorer Garrett. She went to school at St. Mary's in Knoxville, Illinois.

Career
In 1904 Grace Durand began running a model dairy, Crab Tree Farm, in Lake Forest, Illinois, to sell good quality local milk to Chicagoans, and to support her other projects, such as a kindergarten for children in Chicago's tenements. The farm was relocated to Lake Bluff, Illinois in 1906. "I have not entirely given up society for my dairy," Durand explained, "but the work is so interesting that I cannot look upon the time and effort given to it as any sacrifice." Several of the buildings on the farm were lost by fire in 1910. She rebuilt the barns with help from architect Solon Spencer Beman. In 1915, her herd of Guernsey cows was destroyed by government officials because they were suspected of carrying foot and mouth disease. She sued for $100,000 in damages. She lectured at farmers' institutes across the American midwest on her methods and experiences in dairy work, and patented a design for milk jugs.

Grace Durand was the first woman elected to serve on the board of education in Lake Forest, Illinois. She was a member of the Lake Forest Golf Club, and president of the Lake Bluff chapter of the Women's Christian Temperance Union. She wrote a book, Consider, opposing the repeal of Prohibition. Her temperance work was much remarked upon when her husband was accused of participating in a "rum ring" and indicted in 1933.

Personal life
Grace Garrett married wealthy sugar broker Scott Sloan Durand in 1894. They adopted two children. Their son Jackson G. "Jack" Durand was convicted of robbing the home of F. Edson White in 1926, and served a prison sentence. The Durands traveled around the world, even visiting Tristan da Cunha in 1935. Grace died in 1948, aged 80 years.

She donated woven and embroidered shawls from India to the Art Institute of Chicago.

Crab Tree Farm remains a working farm near Lake Bluff today.

References

External links

1867 births
1948 deaths
People from Lake Forest, Illinois
People from Burlington, Iowa
Clubwomen